Martin Vasilev (Bulgarian: Мартин Василев; born 2 January 1992) is a Bulgarian footballer who plays as a defender.

Career
On 19 June 2017, Vasilev was released by Pomorie and returned to his former club Oborishte Panagyurishte a few weeks later.

On 2 July 2018, Vasilev joined Minyor Pernik.

References

External links

1992 births
Living people
Bulgarian footballers
First Professional Football League (Bulgaria) players
Second Professional Football League (Bulgaria) players
Akademik Sofia players
FC Botev Vratsa players
PFC Vidima-Rakovski Sevlievo players
FC Montana players
FC Vitosha Bistritsa players
FC Oborishte players
FC Pomorie players
PFC Minyor Pernik players
FC Lokomotiv 1929 Sofia players
Association football defenders